Peter Pettigrew (born 9 September 1950) is  a former Australian rules footballer who played with Collingwood in the Victorian Football League (VFL).

Notes

External links 

1950 births
Australian rules footballers from Victoria (Australia)
Collingwood Football Club players
Box Hill Football Club players
Box Hill Football Club coaches
Living people